is a four-member Japanese visual kei rock band, currently signed to their own record label, called NDG, they were formerly under Galaxy Inc. and then Ains. The band formed in December 2010 by yo-ka (ex-Valluna and Megamasso roadie), Kei (ex-Valluna), Yuu (ex-Valluna), and later recruited Shoya. Their current fourth member and then-support drummer, Tatsuya, was later on added to the group as an official member after ex-drummer Yuu's departure from the group due to tendinitis. Their debut single "Shitsuyoku no Seiiki" was released on January 19, 2011. Diaura released their first full studio album Genesis on March 21, 2012 and their second full studio album Focus on December 4, 2013.

History
Yo-ka and Yuu first formed a short-lived band called Marely, and after they disbanded, yo-ka joined Valluna, which quickly became popular with fans of visual kei. When Valluna split, yo-ka and guitarist Kei founded Diaura (short for "Dictatorial Aura") with drummer Yuu, and later their agent helped to recruit bassist Shoya. Their first album, Genesis was released in March 2012 to critical acclaim, Allmusic writer John D. Buchanan gave it  four and a half stars, saying "this is one of the best debuts VK had ever seen, spectacularly fulfilling Diaura's promise and cementing their place as one of the pre-eminent bands in the scene."

Drummer Yuu announced his departure from the band in October 2012 due to tendonitis.

In April 2013, support drummer Tatsuya officially joined the band.

Moving to a new label, Blowgrow, allowed them to have access to better quality recording studios which elevated their sound significantly. They later returned to Ains, and then in August 2019, the band established its own indie label called NDG.

Influence
Kei cited Kouichi from Laputa as his primary influence. Tatsuya stated that he was into LUNA SEA, Laputa and JUDY AND MARY.

Members
Current
yo-ka - vocals
Kei (佳衣) - guitar
Shoya (翔也) - bass
Tatsuya (達也) - drums
Former
Yuu (勇) - drums (2010-2012)

Discography

Studio albums
{| class="wikitable plainrowheaders"
|-
! scope="col" rowspan="3"| Title
! scope="col" rowspan="3"| Album details
! scope="col" colspan="2"| Peak positions
|-
! scope="col" colspan="2"| Oricon
|-
! style="width:50px;font-size:90%;" scope="col"| Indies Albums
! style="width:50px;font-size:90%;" scope="col"| Weekly Chart
|-
|Genesis
|Release date: March 21, 2012
|align="center"|
|align="center"|168
|-
|Focus
|Release date: December 4, 2013
|align="center"|
|align="center"|49
|-
|Triangle
|Release date: November 26, 2014
|align="center"|2
|align="center"|33
|-
|Versus
|Release date: November 29, 2017
|align="center"|2
|align="center"|30
|-
|R.I.P.
|Release date: October 6, 2021
|align="center"|3
|align="center"|34
|}

 Compilation albums 

Mini albums

Singles

 
 

DVDs
 独-Dictator-裁 (August 3, 2011)
 Master (November 30, 2011)
 Judgement Day'' (August 28, 2012)

References

External links

 Official website
 Official blog
 Visunavi profile

Visual kei musical groups
Japanese alternative rock groups
Japanese alternative metal musical groups
Musical groups established in 2010
Musical quintets
Musical groups from Tokyo
2010 establishments in Japan